Albert Gregorio De Souza  is a Ghanaian politician and was the member of parliament for the Keta constituency in the 1st parliament of the 2nd republic of Ghana.

Early life and education 
De Souza was born on 13 September 1933. He attended the Presbyterian Training College where he obtained a Teacher's Training Certificate.

Career 
De Souza with his training obtained in teaching worked as a headmaster in a school in Keta. As a result, apart from being a Ghanaian politician, professionally, he was a teacher.

Politics 
De Souza was elected as the member of parliament for the Keta constituency in the 1st parliament of the 2nd republic of Ghana. He was elected on the ticket of the National Alliance of Liberals(NAL) political party.

He was elected following the disqualification by the Supreme Court of the previous member of parliament for the Keta constituency - Mr Komla Gbedemah.

Personal life 
De Souza is a Christian .

References 

Living people
1933 births
Ghanaian MPs 1969–1972
People from Volta Region
Ghanaian Christians
National Alliance of Liberals politicians